Chloroclystis hypopyrrha is a moth in the family Geometridae first described by West in 1929. It is found in Japan.

The wingspan is 16–17 mm.

References

Moths described in 1929
Chloroclystis
Moths of Japan